Thobias Montler (born 15 February 1996) is a Swedish athlete specialising in the long jump. He won a bronze medal at the 2017 European U23 Championships. In addition, he finished fourth at the 2018 European Championships.

His personal bests in the event are 8.27 metres outdoors (Monaco 2021) and 8.38 metres indoors (Belgrade 2022).

He was born Thobias Nilsson Montler, but legally changed his name to omit Nilsson in 2019. Among other reasons, the whole name did not fit on athlete's bibs or plane ticket, and neither had he ever used the Nilsson name personally. He hails from Landskrona.

International competitions

References

1996 births
Living people
People from Landskrona Municipality
Swedish male long jumpers
Malmö AI athletes
Swedish Athletics Championships winners
Athletes (track and field) at the 2020 Summer Olympics
Olympic athletes of Sweden
Diamond League winners
World Athletics Indoor Championships medalists
Sportspeople from Skåne County
21st-century Swedish people
European Athletics Championships medalists